Lepisorus is a genus of ferns in the family Polypodiaceae, subfamily Microsoroideae, according to the Pteridophyte Phylogeny Group classification of 2016 (PPG I).

Taxonomy
Lepisorus was first described by John Smith in 1846 as the section Lepisorus of the genus Drynaria. It was raised from a section to a genus by Ren-Chang Ching in 1933. A molecular phylogenetic study in 2019 suggested that Lepisorus was one of a group of closely related genera in the subfamily Microsoroideae, a group the authors termed "Lepisorus sensu lato".

Species
, the Checklist of Ferns and Lycophytes of the World recognized the following species:

Lepisorus abbreviatus (Fée) Li Wang
Lepisorus accedens (Blume) Hosok.
Lepisorus affinis Ching
Lepisorus albertii (Regel) Ching
Lepisorus amaurolepidus (Sledge) Bir & Trikha
Lepisorus annamensis (C.Chr.) Li Wang
Lepisorus annuifrons (Makino) Ching
Lepisorus balteiformis (Brause) Hovenkamp
Lepisorus bicolor (Takeda) Ching
Lepisorus boninensis Ching
Lepisorus cespitosus Y.X.Lin
Lepisorus clathratus (C.B.Clarke) Ching
Lepisorus confluens W.M.Chu
Lepisorus contortus (Christ) Ching
Lepisorus crassipes Ching & Y.X.Lin
Lepisorus eilophyllus (Diels) Ching
Lepisorus elegans Ching & W.M.Chu
Lepisorus excavatus (Bory ex Willd.) Ching
Lepisorus hachijoensis Sa. Kurata
Lepisorus henryi (Hieron. ex C.Chr.) Li Wang
Lepisorus heterolepis (Rosenst.) Ching
Lepisorus jakonensis (Blanf.) Ching
Lepisorus kawakamii (Hayata) Tagawa
Lepisorus kolesnikovii (Tzvelev) Shmakov
Lepisorus kuchenensis (Y.C.Wu) Ching
Lepisorus kuratae T.Fujiw. & Seriz.
Lepisorus lewisii (Baker) Ching
Lepisorus likiangensis Ching & S.K.Wu
Lepisorus lineariformis Ching & S.K.Wu
Lepisorus loriformis (Wall. ex Mett.) Ching
Lepisorus luchunensis Y.X.Lin
Lepisorus macrosphaerus (Baker) Ching
Lepisorus mamas Hovenkamp
Lepisorus marginatus Ching
Lepisorus medogensis Ching & Y.X.Lin
Lepisorus megasorus (C.Chr.) Ching
Lepisorus mehrae Fraser-Jenk.
Lepisorus mikawanus Kurata
Lepisorus miyoshianus (Makino) Fraser-Jenk. & Subh.Chandra
Lepisorus monilisorus (Hayata) Tagawa
Lepisorus morrisonensis (Hayata) H.Itô
Lepisorus mucronatus (Fée) Li Wang
Lepisorus nigripes T.Fujiw. & Seriz.
Lepisorus novoguineensis (Rosenst.) Li Wang
Lepisorus nudus (Hook.) Ching
Lepisorus obscurevenulosus (Hayata) Ching
Lepisorus oligolepidus (Baker) Ching
Lepisorus onoei (Franch. & Sav.) Ching
Lepisorus oosphaerus (C.Chr.) Ching
Lepisorus perrierianus (C.Chr.) Ching
Lepisorus platyrhynchos (J.Sm. ex Kunze) Li Wang
Lepisorus pseudonudus Ching
Lepisorus pseudoussuriensis Tagawa
Lepisorus schraderi (Mett.) Ching
Lepisorus scolopendrium (Ching) Mehra & Bir
Lepisorus sinensis (Christ) Ching
Lepisorus sordidus (C.Chr.) Ching
Lepisorus spicatus (L.f.) Li Wang
Lepisorus subconfluens Ching
Lepisorus sublinearis (Baker ex Takeda) Ching
Lepisorus suboligolepidus Ching
Lepisorus subsessile Ching & Y.X.Lin
Lepisorus thaipaiensis Ching & S.K.Wu
Lepisorus thunbergianus (Kaulf.) Ching
Lepisorus tosaensis (Makino) H.Itô
Lepisorus tricholepis K.H.Shing & Y.X.Lin
Lepisorus uchiyamae (Makino) H.Itô
Lepisorus ussuriensis (Regel & Mack.) Ching
Lepisorus validinervis (Kunze) Li Wang
Lepisorus yamaokae Seriz.

, Plants of the World Online sank the monotypic Paragramma into Lepisorus, thus including the sole species Paragramma longifolia as Lepisorus longifolius.

References

Polypodiaceae
Fern genera